Siegfried Weiss (18 April 1906 – 8 October 1989) was an East German actor.

Biography
Weiss made his artistic debut on the stage of the Halberstadt Theater, at 1924. He continued his career in the theaters of Lübeck, Königsberg, Magdeburg, Leipzig and Berlin, where he acted in the Berlin Ensemble, among others.

Weiss' film career started already in the Nazi era, with the 1937 Sherlock Holmes inspired movie Die Graue Dame (The Gray Lady), and had lasted for almost fifty years. After the Second World War he returned to acting on screen, working with the East German studio DEFA and with the television producers DFF. He appeared in more than fifty independent GDR productions and in co-productions with other Eastern Bloc countries, such as the epic movies Ernst Thaelmann, Karl Liebknecht and Liberation. He retired in 1984. Weiss retired at 1987, making his last appearance on stage in the Berlin Ensemble on 25 October that year.

Partial filmography

 The Grey Lady (1937) - Ganove
 The Call of the Sea (1951)
 Die Unbesiegbaren (1953) - Kriminalbeamter
 Die Störenfriede (1953) - Erichs Vater
 Kein Hüsung (1954) - Graf Pfeil
 Alarm in Zirkus (1954) - Hepfield
 Ernst Thaelmann - Leader of his Class (1955) - industrialist
 Der Teufelskreis (1956) - Hanussen
 Zwischenfall in Benderath (1956) - Direktor Tappert
 Rivalen am Steuer (1957) - Alvarez
 Berlin – Ecke Schönhauser… (1957) - Fritz Erdmann
 Spielbank-Affäre (1957) - Balduin
 Gejagt bis zum Morgen (1957) - Eleganter Herr
 Sie kannten sich alle (1958) - Dr. Blei
 Der Prozeß wird vertagt (1958)
 Das Lied der Matrosen (1958)
 Erich Kubak (1959) - Egon Hempel
 Doctor Ahrendt's Decision (1960) - Kripphahn
 Der Traum des Hauptmann Loy (1961) - Colonel Nelson
 Henker - Der Tod hat ein Gesicht (1961) - Sekretär
 Das Stacheltier - Der Dieb von San Marengo (1963) - Syndikus der Hohlkörper AG
 Jetzt und in der Stunde meines Todes (1963) - Geschworener : Herr Meier
 Engel im Fegefeuer (1964) - Polizeioffizier
 Das Stacheltier - Das blaue Zimmer (1964) - (voice)
 The Story of a Murder (1965) - Dr. Rotholz
 Solange Leben in mir ist (1965) - Franz Mehring
 The Escape In The Silent (1966) - Juwelier
 Ohne Kampf kein Sieg (1966, TV Mini-Series)
 Ich - Axel Caesar Springer (1968, TV Series)
 Mohr und die Raben von London (1968) - Ender
 Der Mord, der nie verjährt (1968) - Prosecutor General
 Lebende Ware (1969) - Ferenc Chorin
  (1970) - Oberst am Klavier
 KLK Calling PTZ - The Red Orchestra  (1971) - Canaris
 Husaren in Berlin (1971) - Gotzkowsky
 Liberation III: Direction of the Main Blow (1971) - Manstein
 Trotz alledem! (1972)
 Das zweite Leben des Friedrich Wilhelm Georg Platow (1973) - Obersekretär Dollwitz
 Зарево над Драва (1974)
 Take Aim (1975) - Niels Bohr
 Komödianten-Emil (1980) - Meyer sen.
 Die Gerechten von Kummerow (1982) - Amtsrichter
 Romeo and Julia auf dem Dorfe (1984) - Richter
 Polizeiruf 110 (1984, TV Series) - Alois Hauber

References

External links

1906 births
1989 deaths
People from Chemnitz
German male film actors
German male television actors
German male stage actors
20th-century German male actors